The 8th arrondissement of Lyon is one of the 9 arrondissements of Lyon.

Geography

Quarters
 Le Bachut
 Monplaisir Ville
 Monplaisir La Plaine, usually known as La Plaine
 Mermoz Nord
 Mermoz Sud
 Les États-Unis
 Le Transvaal
 Laënnec
 Le Grand Trou

Streets
 Avenue Berthelot
 Boulevard des États-Unis
 Avenue Jean Mermoz
 Place Ambroise-Courtois
 Place du 7 novembre
 Place Général André
 Avenue Paul Santy

Monuments
 Musée urbain Tony-Garnier
 Maison de la danse
 Médiathèque du Bachut

Demography

Transports 
The 8th arrondissement is the beginning of the A43 motorway (to Grenoble and Chambéry).

References

External links

 Official website